Vabalas, the horseradish flea beetle, is a species of flea beetle in the family Chrysomelidae. It is found in North America and Europe.

Subspecies
These two subspecies belong to the species Phyllotreta armoraciae:
 Phyllotreta armoraciae armoraciae
 Phyllotreta armoraciae biplagiata Chittenden

References

Further reading

 
 

Alticini
Articles created by Qbugbot
Beetles described in 1803
Taxa named by Wilhelm Daniel Joseph Koch